Ata (Ata of Davao, Atao Manobo, Langilan) is a Manobo language of northeastern Mindanao of the Philippines. It is spoken in northwest Davao del Norte province, southeast Bukidnon province, Davao de Oro province (northwest border), and Davao del Sur province (northwest enclave).

References

Manobo languages
Aeta languages
Languages of Surigao del Norte
Languages of Surigao del Sur